The Philippine Daily Inquirer (PDI), or simply the Inquirer, is an English-language newspaper in the Philippines. Founded in 1985, it is often regarded as the Philippines' newspaper of record. The newspaper is the most awarded broadsheet in the Philippines and the multimedia group, called The Inquirer Group, reaches 54 million people across several platforms.

History
The Philippine Daily Inquirer was founded on December 9, 1985, by publisher Eugenia Apóstol, columnist Max Solivén, together with Betty Go-Belmonte during the last days of the regime of President Ferdinand Marcos, becoming one of the first private newspapers to be established under the Marcos regime.

The Inquirer succeeded the weekly Philippine Inquirer, created in 1985 by Apostol to cover the trial of 25 soldiers accused of complicity in the assassination of opposition leader Ninoy Aquino at Manila International Airport on August 21, 1983. Apostol also published the Mr. & Ms. Special Edition, a weekly tabloid opposed to the Marcos regime.

Beltran years (1985–1989)
As the successor to the previous Mr. & Ms. Special Edition and the weekly Philippine Inquirer, it was founded on a budget of ₱1 million and enjoyed a daily circulation of 30,000 in its early days. The new daily was housed in the dilapidated one-story Star Building at 13th and Railroad streets in Port Area, Manila. It was put out by 40 editors, reporters, correspondents, photographers and other editorial employees working in a 100-square-meter newsroom. Columnist Louie Beltran was named its editor-in-chief.

The newspaper was instrumental in documenting the campaign of Corazon Aquino during the 1986 presidential elections and, in turn, the 1986 People Power Revolution. Its slogan, Balanced News, Fearless Views, was incorporated to the newspaper in January 1986 after a slogan-making contest held during the first month of the Inquirers existence. In this period, the newspaper reached a high circulation of 500,000 copies a day.

In July 1986, questions about finances and a divergence of priorities caused a rift among the founders that led Belmonte, Soliven, and Art Borjal's split from the Inquirer to establish The Philippine Star. As Belmonte owned the Star Building where the Inquirer was headquartered, the newspaper amicably transferred to the Soliven-owned BF Condominium on Aduana Street, Intramuros.

Pascual years (1989–1991)
In February 1987, Federico D. Pascual, former assistant managing editor of the Daily Express, was named executive editor of the Inquirer and was appointed editor-in-chief two years later. It was during his term in 1990 that the Inquirer took the lead from the Manila Bulletin to become the Philippines' newspaper with the highest circulation.

However, in July 1990, the Inquirer headquarters in Intramuros was damaged by the 1990 Luzon earthquake. On January 5, 1991, the newspaper transferred to the YIC building along United Nations Avenue and Romualdez Street in Malate.

Jimenez-Magsanoc years (1991–2015)

Inquirer's longest-serving and first woman editor-in-chief, the late Letty Jimenez-Magsanoc, was appointed on June 14, 1991. She was a former columnist and editor of the Panorama Sunday magazine of Bulletin Today (now Manila Bulletin) who was sacked for writing articles poking fun at Marcos. She edited Mr & Ms Special Edition until the fall of the Marcos regime. She was also the first editor-in-chief of Sunday Inquirer Magazine.

Under her term, on January 12, 1995, the Inquirer moved to its current headquarters in Makati after transferring headquarters four times.

President Joseph Estrada accused the Inquirer of "bias, malice, and fabrication" against him, charges that the newspaper denied. In 1999, several government organizations, pro-Estrada businesses, and movie producers simultaneously pulled their advertisements from the Inquirer in a boycott that lasted for five months. Malacañang Palace was widely implicated in the advertising boycott, which publisher Isagani Yambot denounced as an attack on the freedom of the press.

In 2017, according to the survey conducted by AGB Nielsen, the Inquirer was the most widely read newspaper in the Philippines. The Manila Bulletin and The Philippine Star followed as the second and the third most widely read papers, respectively. Magsanoc died on December 24, 2015, at St. Luke's Medical Center in Taguig. A month after her death, Jimenez-Magsanoc was recognized as the Filipino of the Year 2015 by the Inquirer.

Nolasco years (2016–2018)
On February 2, 2016, the Inquirer appointed its managing editor Jose Ma. Nolasco as the executive editor, the new top position of the newspaper, replacing the traditional editor-in-chief position used by the Inquirer for more than three decades.

Readership 
According to the company's website the newspaper has over 2.7 million nationwide readers daily, it enjoys a market share of over 50% and tops the readership surveys.

Reputation
At least two opinion pieces cite the Inquirer as the Philippines' newspaper of record, but as an opportunity for criticism: The Manila Times criticized it for "publish[ing] ... vapid, unthinking positions" which it called "reprehensible, at best"; GMA News, in 2014, noted it as a "de facto paper of record", followed by "This distinguished history only makes it more painful to say that the paper is starting to suck".

See also

 Inquirer Compact
 Inquirer Libre
 Isagani Yambot - Publisher of the Philippine Daily Inquirer from 1994 to 2012
 Letty Jimenez Magsanoc - longest-serving and first woman editor-in-chief
 Rina Jimenez-David - columnist

References

External links

Media Ownership Monitor Philippines - Media Companies: A Duopoly Rules by VERA Files and Reporters Without Borders
Media Ownership Monitor Philippines - Print by VERA Files and Reporters Without Borders

 
English-language newspapers published in the Philippines
Publications established in 1985
National newspapers published in the Philippines
Newspapers published in Metro Manila
Companies based in Makati
1985 establishments in the Philippines